Basil Staunton Batty OBE (12 May 1873 – 19 March 1952) was an Anglican suffragan bishop in the 20th century.

Basil Batty was born into an ecclesiastical family on 12 May 1873: his father, William Edmund Batty, was Vicar of St John's, Walham Green. After education at St Paul's and Selwyn College, Cambridge, Batty began his ordained ministry as a curate at St Clement's, York. Following this he was Vicar of Medmenham, then Rector of South Hackney. Further incumbencies followed at St Gabriel's, Warwick Square, and Christ Church, Mayfair. He was also Rector of St Anne and St Agnes, Gresham Street. In 1926 he was ordained to the episcopate as the first Bishop of Fulham, a post he was to hold until 1947. A noted Europhile, he died on 19 March 1952.

References

External links

1878 births
People educated at St Paul's School, London
Alumni of Selwyn College, Cambridge
Officers of the Order of the British Empire
Bishops of Fulham
20th-century Church of England bishops
1952 deaths